Javier Alatorre (born in Navojoa, Sonora) is a Mexican journalist. He is the anchorman of Hechos the headline news program of TV Azteca.

References

Living people
21st-century Mexican journalists
Male journalists
Mexican news anchors
People from Navojoa
Year of birth missing (living people)